Benjamin Electric Manufacturing Company was a Des Plaines, Illinois electrical company founded in the late 19th century.

The company was founded by Reuben Berkley Benjamin and filed its first patent for an electric lamp socket in 1898. The company went on to manufacture various other electrical products. One of Benjamin's most notable products was their series of non-contact fire alarm horns, introduced in the early 1920s. They were available in flush-mount, single, and double projector versions, in either red or gray. These horns were mainly used by IBM, and later SimplexGrinnell up until the 1960s. In 1958, Benjamin was bought out by Thomas Industries, Inc.

The company's factory in Illinois was closed in 1963, and was replaced with a new  light fixture plant in Sparta, TN.

Biography of Reuben Berkley Benjamin and background history of Benjamin Electric Manufacturing Company / Benjamin Electric, Ltd. London

Citation and summarization from:

•	The Electrical World, June 2, 1923

•	Article from The Alumnus of Iowa State, by Arch. R. Crawford, 1931

•	In Memoriam of R. B. Benjamin, ’92; article from Vol. XXIX, January 1934

•	Obituary - Reuben B. Benjamin: In Memoriam, January 1934

•	Her Majesty Queen Elizabeth II, “EIIR The Coronation Booklet” – published by Holophane Ltd. November 9, 1953

Reuben Berkley Benjamin, born May 20, 1869, in Fulton, New York, to Timothy R. and Harriet E. Benjamin, and died December 26, 1933.  He graduated with a Bachelor of Science in Electrical Engineering, class of 1892, and was one of the three men to whom Iowa State College first granted a degree in Electrical Engineering, at Ames, Iowa, in 1892.  After graduation, Mr. Benjamin entered the chosen field of his profession, as employed by the Commonwealth Edison Company in Chicago.

He invented the wireless cluster, a device which perfected and revolutionized the lighting fixture.  In 1901, with his patents, Benjamin partnered with three Ames men (from Iowa State College): W. Clyde Jones, Walter D. Steele, and Keene H. Addington, law partner of Mr. Jones.  He launched a business from his Chicago home’s basement with his wife, Annie Knott Benjamin as his bookkeeper.  He continued to engage in the invention and manufacture of electrical appliances.  Reuben was the head of the Benjamin Electric Manufacturing Company, which expanded from Chicago to New York, San Francisco, Toronto, Canada and London, England.  He patented more than 350 devices, mostly in the field of electric lighting, with more patents pending at the time of his death.  He was fourth among inventors in the United States for the number of patents received with Edison as the number one.  He was a proficient mathematician, skilled engineer, and a competent executive; as well as a member of the American Association of Electrical Engineers.

In addition to the wireless cluster, he was the inventor of the weatherproof, one-piece socket-reflector dome lighting system, the swivel plug, the Benjamin Crysteel Porcelain Enameled products (e.g. table tops, stove parts, washing machine tubs, refrigerators, refrigerator linings, and similar products), the “Benco” socket, “Benox” interchangeable devices, two-way plugs, many designs of industrial lighting equipment, safety lighting for oil refineries and places where gases or explosive dusts are present, besides hundreds of wiring improvements, many of which have been generally adopted.  He was a collaborator in the development of “Elexits.”

He was also the inventor of the R.L.M. (Reflector and Lamp Manufacturers), and this patent was sold to General Electric Company who in turn licensed its use to manufacturers.  The R. L. M. reflector dome and others developed by the Benjamin Company have had a profound influence in the improvement of industrial illumination, and it is difficult to estimate the dollar value of the increased production and efficiency that have resulted since their introduction.  Many electrical consumers, industrial and domestic, use one or more of Mr. Benjamin’s inventions, including two, three and four-way wireless plugs, wireless and adjustable stand-lamp clusters, swivel attachment plugs, R. L. M. Dome Reflectors, weatherproof sockets, and many others.  Additional patents issued to Mr. Benjamin cover speed control devices for gasoline engines, carburetors, safety devices for punch presses, laundry machinery safety devices, radio condensers, and automatic temperature control devices for flatirons.

The most interesting sidelight on the man is the novel way he approached a new invention.  It is exactly the opposite of Edison’s method, according to reports of the working practices.  When Edison got interested in a new idea it is said that, first, he researched to find out what has already been done to solve the problem.  This preliminary preparation took weeks, sometimes months; the theory being to avoid duplication of effort.  This period of preparation may have something to do with Edison’s alleged remark that “genius is five percent inspiration and ninety-five percent perspiration.”  Yet there seems to be another type of genius in which inspiration plays a much larger part, and Reuben Benjamin was an example.  “When I visualize some desirable result,” he explained, “I prefer to head for it directly.  This means, first of all, clearing my mind as much as possible of everything that may have been done about it previously.  My memory isn’t particularly good and, strange as it may seem, I believe that this is a help rather than a drawback because then my brain isn’t cluttered up with old information.  I try to proceed straight toward the objective just as though no one else had ever worked on the problem.  I depend much on flashes of insight and you’d be surprised how often you can cut ‘cross lots toward your goal when you start with an unprejudiced mind.”

After getting as far as possible on one of those direct line hunches he would then begins the necessary check-up for possible patent infringements and other practical considerations.

Before he was ready to submit a design to the Patent Office he had usually changed the original idea many times.  “But for all that,” he contends, “heading directly for your goal brings you up against far less patent interference than you’d think.”

In his efforts to promote safety he co-operated with the National Board of Fire Underwriters, the Underwriters Laboratories, the National Safety Council and other bodies.  He was a hard-working member of the N. E. L. A. and other electrical societies.

After his death, Benjamin Electric Ltd. The company continued on with his legacy.  Two of the most noticeable accomplishments were the “Benjamin” Flood Lighting system in Westminster Abbey for the Queen Elizabeth II Coronation in 1953 (Benjamin Electric Ltd. Manufactured equipment used by Holophane Ltd. at Coronation) and the Tower Bridge of London in 1964.

Quote from Her Majesty Queen Elizabeth II, “EIIR The Coronation Booklet” – published November 9, 1953:

“In conclusion, we feel it would be of interest to quote the words of Dr. Ward Harrison, the eminent American Lighting Engineer and President of the International Commission on Illumination, who in a recent lecture to the Illuminating Engineering Society in London, said:

	“I have not yet seen any indoor illumination to equal the light of Westminster Abbey for the Coronation.  In that problem, there were three prime requirements, distinctly individual, and almost mutually exclusive.  For the first time lighting designed to make television and colour motion picture photography possible was likewise the most effective that could have been devised for viewing the great spectacle by those people seated in the Abbey; for people at great distances from the crowning, it was just as necessary to have 120 Ft. c. there as it is on the stage of a theatre, and yet it was provided in a way that was infinitely more kind to the principals who took part and who continued under it for some three hours.  For that installation, and for the genius of those who make it possible, my admiration is unbounded.””

Fire detection and alarm